Chelyabinsk Airport  is an airport in Russia located 18 km north of Chelyabinsk. It services large airliners and can park up to 51 aircraft. It also serves as a secondary hub for Ural Airlines and Yamal Airlines.

History

Passenger flights to Chelyabinsk were served by Chelyabinsk Shagol Airport from 1938 and until it was repurposed for military only use.

The current Chelyabinsk airport, initially called Balandino Airport, was opened in late 1953 with a passenger terminal and a dirt runway. The runway was paved in December 1962. A year later, the first jet plane (a Tu-104) arrived to the airport.

A new terminal was built in 1974 which remains in service to this day as one of the terminal buildings. In 1994, the government-owned airport was privatized and started its first international flights.

Passenger traffic reached 1.1 million and declined heavily during the 1990s. In 2013, the airport handled 1.2 million passengers, breaking the Soviet-time record.

The new, longer runway was built in 1999 while the old runway was repurposed as a taxiway. The airport is accepting heavy aircraft including Boeing 747 and An-225.

New terminal construction and airport expansion 
The construction of the new passenger terminal is planned at Chelyabinsk Airport, this is done for BRICS summit in 2020. The project includes the construction of the new terminal, where it will commence in summer 2018 and finish by December 2019. The complex will be able to handle 2,5 million passengers per annum. The next plans for the airport is to take the third category of ICAO. This category in Russia is owned only by Moscow's Domodedovo and Sheremetyevo Airports and Pulkovo Airport in Saint Petersburg.

Airlines and destinations

Passenger

Cargo

Passenger statistics

Accidents and incidents
 On 26 January 2008, an S7 Airlines Airbus A319 landed on the taxiway by mistake. There were no injuries or damage.
 On 26 May 2008, an Antonov An-12 operated by Moskovia Airlines crashed shortly after takeoff when trying an emergency landing. All nine crew members on board died.
 On 17 July 2015, an An-12BK of the Russian Air Force registered RF-94291 diverted to Chelyabinsk Airport after flying into severe thunderstorm and hail. Three out of four engines failed. The aircraft landed on the grass outside the runway and sustained substantial damage. There were no injuries.

Miscellaneous facts
An NDB beacon transmits on 412 kHz.

See also 
Chelyabinsk Shagol Airport
List of the busiest airports in Russia
List of the busiest airports in the former USSR

References

External links

 Official website with photos

Airports built in the Soviet Union
Airports in Chelyabinsk Oblast
Chelyabinsk
Novaport